Crambeidae is a family of marine demosponges.

Identification of members of this family of sponges is based on microscopic examination of the spicules in their skeleton. The megascleres consist of peripheral thinner subtylostyles and thicker choanosomal styles while the microscleres are exclusively anchorate chelae.

Genera

Crambe Vosmaer, 1880
Discorhabdella Dendy, 1924
Lithochela Burton, 1929
Monanchora Carter, 1883

References

Poecilosclerida